Oflag VII-A Murnau was a German Army prisoner-of-war camp for Polish Army officers during World War II.

Camp history

The camp was created in September 1939. It consisted of an enclosure  square, surrounded with barbed wire and guard towers. Immediately after the German invasion of Poland, at the beginning of World War II, some 1,000 Polish officers were imprisoned there. On April 27, 1942, additional Polish POWs were transferred there from the so-called "Generals' Camp" Oflag VIII-E in Janské Koupele in German-occupied Czechoslovakia (now in the Czech Republic). After the failed Warsaw Uprising and Operation Tempest more prisoners were brought there from Poland. By early 1945 the number of POWs held in the camp reached over 5,000.

The camps was liberated by troops of the U.S. 12th Armored Division on 29 April 1945.

List of notable prisoners 
Among those imprisoned in Murnau were:

Rear Admiral (Kontradmirał) 
 Józef Unrug

Divisional Generals (Generał dywizji) 
 Władysław Bortnowski
 Tadeusz Kutrzeba
 Tadeusz Piskor
 Juliusz Rómmel

Brigade Generals (Generał brygady) 

Roman Abraham
Franciszek Alter
Władysław Bończa-Uzdowski

Walerian Czuma

Juliusz Drapella
Janusz Gąsiorowski
Edmund Knoll-Kownacki
Wincenty Kowalski

Józef Kwaciszewski
Stanisław Małachowski
Czesław Młot-Fijałkowski
Bernard Mond

Wacław Piekarski
Zygmunt Podhorski

Jan Jagmin-Sadowski
Antoni Szylling
Stanisław Taczak
Wiktor Thommée
Juliusz Zulauf

Majors 
Seweryn Kulesza

Capitans

See also
 List of prisoner-of-war camps in Germany

References

External links

 Life in Murnau 
 The forgotten photos

Oflags
Garmisch-Partenkirchen (district)
Polish prisoners of war in World War II
World War II prisoner of war camps in Germany
1939 establishments in Germany
1945 disestablishments in Germany